Frederick Waugh may refer to:
Frederick Judd Waugh (1861–1940), American marine artist
Frederick V. Waugh (1898–1974), American agricultural economist
Fred Waugh (1869–1919), Australian rules footballer